Josephites may refer to one of the following:

 Josephites of Belgium, a Roman Catholic religious congregation
 Saint Joseph's Missionary Society of Mill Hill, a Roman Catholic religious society of apostolic life, headquartered outside London
 Society of St. Joseph of the Sacred Heart, a Catholic religious society of apostolic life, headquartered in Baltimore who minister to African-Americans (originally a part of the above Mill Hill Fathers)
 Josephite (Latter Day Saints), any adherent tracing the Restorationist priesthood through Joseph Smith III
 Josephites, followers of Joseph Volotsky, Russian monk who advocated the church's ownership of land, social activity and charity
 Josephites, members of the Josephite movement, a 20th-century movement in the Russian Orthodox Church
 Josephites, members of the Congregation of Sisters of St Joseph of the Sacred Heart
 Josephites, students and alumni of St Joseph's College, Allahabad
 Josephites, students and alumni of St Joseph's Boys' High School, Bangalore
 Josephites, students and alumni of St. Joseph's College, Bangalore
 Josephites, students and alumni of St. Joseph's Sec School, Seppa, Arunachal Pradesh

See also
Josephite marriage
Josephines
Josephinism, whose adherents are called Josephists